Taraclia is a district in the south of Moldova, with the administrative center at Taraclia.

As of 1 January 2012, its population was 44,100, 65.6% of whom were ethnic Bulgarians.

History 
The district was formed on November 11, 1940, with its center in the village of Taraclia, in the Moldavian SSR. Until October 16, 1949 it was part of the Cahul uyezd, after the abolition of the uyezd it passed to direct republican subordination.

Between January 31, 1952 and June 15, 1953 the area was part of Cahul county, after the abolition of the county division it returned to direct republican subordination.

On January 9, 1956 the territory of Taraclia district was almost doubled due to the annexation of parts of the territory of the abolished Kangazi district.

On December 25, 1962 a new division of the territory of the Republic was established. The Taraclia region was abolished and its territory was divided between the neighboring regions of Kagul, Komrat and Chadarlung.

On November 10, 1980, the district was restored with almost the same boundaries as in 1956, adding part of the territories of Vulkanesti and Chadarlung districts.

In the mid-1990s, after the creation of the autonomous territorial entity of Gagauzia, there was a mutual transfer of villages between Gagauzia and the Taraclia region. As a result of the transfer, the region was territorially divided into two unrelated parts.

In 1999, as part of the ongoing administrative reform, the region became part of the Kagul uyezd, but on October 22, 1999, at the request of the majority of ethnic Bulgarians in the region, a separate Taraclia uyezd was created.

The Taraclia rajon has existed since 2003. Until February 2003, the area belonged to the now dissolved Cahul District (Județul Cahul) together with today's Rajon Cahul and Cantemir. As the center of the Bulgarian minority in Moldova, which accounts for about 66% of the population, today there are numerous Bulgarian cultural institutions and schools in Taraclia District. The Bulgarian language is also one of the languages of instruction at the Taraclia State University.

The regional authorities in Taraclia have long been demanding more autonomy rights for their region. In early 2014, a union with the autonomous region of Gagauzia was also discussed. According to the regional president of Taraclia, numerous other localities, mostly inhabited by Bulgarians, from other parts of Moldova applied to join the Taraclia district. Semi-independent of Moldova's central government, the rayon regional administration maintains separate relations with Russia. Taraclia is considered a stronghold of pro-Russian political parties in Moldova. Due to dissatisfaction with the Chișinău government, separatist tendencies have intensified in the region in recent years.

Demographics
Births (2010): 464 (10.5 per 1000)
Deaths (2010): 562 (12.7 per 1000)
Growth Rate (2010): –98 (–2.2 per 1000)

Ethnic groups 

Footnote: * There is an ongoing controversy regarding the ethnic identification of Moldovans and Romanians.

Religion 
Christians – 96.6%
Orthodox Christians - 94.3%
Protestant – 2.3%
Baptists – 1.3%
Evangelicals – 0.5%
Pentecostals – 0.3%
Seventh-day Adventists – 0.2%
Other – 1.7%
No Religion – 1.3%
Atheists – 0.4%

Politics
Traditionally in Taraclia district, political and electoral support for the PCRM is higher than the rest of the southern part of Moldova. Communists have the largest percentage of the Moldova votes in this district. But the last three elections communists saw a continuous decline in percentage.

During the last three elections AEI had an increase of 147.1%

Elections

|-
!style="background-color:#E9E9E9" align=center colspan="2" valign=center|Parties and coalitions
!style="background-color:#E9E9E9" align=right|Votes
!style="background-color:#E9E9E9" align=right|%
!style="background-color:#E9E9E9" align=right|+/−
|-
| 
|align=left|Party of Communists of the Republic of Moldova
|align="right"|13,561
|align="right"|69.61
|align="right"|−11.09
|-
| 
|align=left|Democratic Party of Moldova
|align="right"|2,180
|align="right"|11,19
|align="right"|+1.14
|-
| 
|align=left|Liberal Democratic Party of Moldova
|align="right"|1,217
|align="right"|6.25
|align="right"|+3.28
|-
|bgcolor="grey"|
|align=left|United Moldova
|align="right"|621
|align="right"|3.19
|align="right"|+3.19
|-
|bgcolor="grey"|
|align=left|Humanist Party of Moldova
|align="right"|483
|align="right"|2.48
|align="right"|+2.48
|-
| 
|align=left|Social Democratic Party
|align="right"|425
|align="right"|2.18
|align="right"|+0.22
|-
| 
|align=left|Party Alliance Our Moldova
|align="right"|256
|align="right"|1.31
|align="right"|−0.62
|-
| 
|align=left|Liberal Party
|align="right"|192
|align="right"|1.00
|align="right"|−0.20
|-
|bgcolor="grey"|
|align=left|Other Party
|align="right"|548
|align="right"|2.79
|align="right"|+1.60
|-
|align=left style="background-color:#E9E9E9" colspan="2"|Total (turnout 60.80%)
|width="30" align="right" style="background-color:#E9E9E9"|19,656
|width="30" align="right" style="background-color:#E9E9E9"|100.00
|width="30" align="right" style="background-color:#E9E9E9"|

References 

 Rezultatele alegerilor din 28 noiembrie 2010 în raionul Taraclia

 
Districts of Moldova
Bulgarian communities in Moldova
Bulgarian-speaking countries and territories